Doruntina Shala (born 14 December 1996), known professionally as Tayna, is a Kosovo-Albanian rapper and singer. Born and raised in Prizren, she rose to prominence in the Albanian-speaking territories during the span of 2018 after the releases of five top-three singles. Her success was further solidified upon her breakthrough in German-speaking territories in 2020 as she signed a record contract with Sony Music.

Life and career

1996–2019: Early life and career beginnings 

Doruntina Shala was born on 14 December 1996 into an Albanian family in the city of Prizren, then part of the FR Yugoslavia, present Kosovo. Shala unsuccessfully auditioned for the first season of Talent X in 2016. She made her breakthrough in the Albanian-speaking territories, following the releases of "Columbiana" and "Shqipe" topping the charts in Albania. In August 2018, she performed at the Sunny Hill Festival in Pristina along other acclaimed artists such as Action Bronson, Martin Garrix and Dua Lipa. In December 2018, she released her follow-up single "Aje" featuring fellow Kosovo-Albanian rapper Ledri Vula. In the same month, she was named as the personality of the year by the Kosovan television programme Privé.

In February 2019, Shala released the follow-up single titled "Ring Ring" and peaked at number eight in Albania. "Ring Ring" was succeeded by two top 10-singles, including "Kce" and "Caliente", the latter with Albanian producer Cricket. In August 2019, she collaborated with Albanian rappers Lyrical Son and MC Kresha on "Pasite". The single reached number one in Albania and peaked at number 155 on the Spotify charts in Switzerland. Nevertheless, the follow-up collaboration with fellow Kosovo-Albanian singer Dafina Zeqiri, "Bye Bye", also reached number one in her native country. "Sicko" and "Sorry", the subsequent releases, attained success in Albania, reaching number 2 and 13, respectively, on the local chart. In June 2019, Shala signed a two-year contract with the Kosovan coffee company Devolli Corporation.

2020–present: Bipolar and continued success 

In January 2020, Shala collaborated with Kosovo-Albanian rapper Mozzik on their single "Edhe ti", which was released to commercial success in Albania and the German-speaking territories. In July 2020, the rapper signed a record contract with the German subsidiary label of Sony Music. Succeeding "Bass", the single, "Qe Qe", peaked at number nine in Albania and went on to reach number 45 in Switzerland. In January 2021, she released her single titled "Moona" featuring French-Algerian rapper L'Algérino while peaking at number 83 in Switzerland. Another charting collaboration followed in June 2021 with the release of "Ti harro" with German-Albanian rapper Azet. In the same month, Shala was chosen as the protagonist on the summer collection titled Playboy x DEF of the German subsidiary of Playboy and German streetwear brand DefShop. In November 2021, she collaborated a second time with Ledri Vula on the follow-up single "Hala", which went on to peak at number 55 in Switzerland.

Dedicated to Albanian women, "Heroinat" was released as the introduction single of Shala's upcoming debut studio album, Bipolar, on 28 November 2021 coinciding with the celebration of Albanian independence day. "OFG" was released as the record's second single in December 2021.

Artistry 

The music style of Shala has often been regarded as hip hop and R&B, although her music also includes various styles of musical genres such as reggaeton and dance. She is enthusiastic about literature and has frequently expressed her passion for reading and the books that have influenced her life.

Discography

Albums 
 Bipolar (TBA)

Singles

As lead artist

2010s

2020s

As featured artist

References

External links 

1996 births
21st-century Albanian rappers
21st-century Albanian women singers
Albanian women rappers
Albanian hip hop singers
Albanian rhythm and blues singers
Albanian songwriters
Albanian-language singers
Kosovan people of Albanian descent
Kosovan rappers
Kosovan singers
Kosovo Albanians
Living people
People from Prizren
Sony Music artists
21st-century women rappers
Musicians from Prizren